Ulmyeon (hangul: 울면) is a Korean-Chinese noodles, vegetables (including shiitake mushrooms, white button mushrooms, and carrots), egg, and seafood (including sea cucumber, shrimp, and squid or cuttlefish) in a chowder-like broth that is thickened with cornstarch. It is derived from a Chinese dish called wēnlŭmiàn (溫滷麵). It is often served in Korean Chinese restaurants as a non-spicy alternative to jjamppong. A variation on the dish is samseon ulmyeon (삼선울면 "3-ingredient ulmyeon"), which is a more expensive option that contains additional portions and/or varieties of seafood.

External links
Ulmyeon page
Ulmyeon page
Ulmyeon recipe (Korean)

Korean Chinese cuisine
Seafood dishes
Noodle soups
Korean noodle dishes